Church of the Intercession may refer to:

Church of the Intercession (Manhattan), New York, United States
Church of the Intercession of the Most Holy Mother of God in Khanty-Mansiysk, Russia
Church of the Intercession of the Virgin Mary, Tomsk, Russia
Church of the Intercession on the Nerl, Bogolyubovo, Russia
Church of the Intercession (Elizavetinskaya), Russia
Church of the Intercession (Kamensk-Shakhtinsky), Russia
Church of the Intercession (Konstantinovsk), Russia
Church of the Intercession (Novocherkassk), Russia

de:Mariä-Schutz-und-Fürbitte-Kirche